June Speakman is an American politician. She serves as a Democratic member for the 68th district of the Rhode Island House of Representatives.

Speakman worked at the Roger Williams University as a professor. In 2019, she was elected for the 68th district of the Rhode Island House of Representatives, assuming office on March 13, 2019.

References 

Living people
Place of birth missing (living people)
Year of birth missing (living people)
Democratic Party members of the Rhode Island House of Representatives
21st-century American politicians
21st-century American women politicians
20th-century American women
Roger Williams University faculty